The following is a list of episodes for the Japanese anime series SoltyRei, originally aired from October 6, 2005, to March 30, 2006, and one OVA episode special. Extra Episode(25 - 26) was a double feature-length episode and it was released on the final volume of the Japanese DVD collection in July 2006. Extra Episode (OVA) has also been aired on Animax when it premiered in the Southeast-Asia region.

Episode list

References 

SoltyRei